Witherspoon is a Scottish surname, deriving from the elements wether, an archaic name for 'sheep' and spang, which means 'a narrow strip of land'. The name is found in the county of Lanarkshire.

List
Notable people with the name include:

Athletics
Ahkello Witherspoon (born 1995), American football player
Brian Witherspoon (born 1985), American football player
Chazz Witherspoon (born 1981), heavyweight boxer
Derrick Witherspoon (born 1971), former American football and Canadian football player
Jim Witherspoon (born 1951), retired Canadian professional ice hockey defenceman
Reggie Witherspoon (basketball), head coach of the University at Buffalo men's basketball team
Reggie Witherspoon (sprinter) (born 1985), American sprinter
Sophia Witherspoon (born 1969), former WNBA basketball player
Tim Witherspoon (born 1957), American boxer twice recognized as Heavyweight Champion of the World
Will Witherspoon (born 1980), American football player
Brent Witherspoon (born 2005), American football player

Entertainers
Cora Witherspoon (1890–1957), American actress
Dane Witherspoon (1957–2014), American actor
Herbert Witherspoon (1873–1935), American bass singer and opera manager
Jimmy Witherspoon (1920–1997), American blues singer
John Witherspoon (actor) (1942–2019), American comedy actor
Lajon Witherspoon (born 1972), vocalist for the Atlanta-based alternative metal band Sevendust
Reese Witherspoon (born 1976), American actress and film producer

Politicians
Buddy Witherspoon, former National Executive Committeeman of the South Carolina Republican Party
James Hervey Witherspoon, Jr., (1810–1865), Confederate States of America politician
John Witherspoon (1723–1794) clergyman and signatory of the United States Declaration of Independence
Doctor John Witherspoon, a bronze sculpture in Washington D.C. by William Couper of John Witherspoon
Robert Witherspoon (1767–1837), U.S. Representative from South Carolina
Samuel Andrew Witherspoon (1855–1915), U.S. Representative from Mississippi

Others
Frances M. Witherspoon, (1886–1973), American writer and activist
Gary Witherspoon, Professor of American Indian studies at the University of Washington
Sarah Witherspoon, American mathematician
Sharon Witherspoon, British statistician

References

English-language surnames
Surnames of English origin